Amouda Cinema was a movie theater in Amuda town in Al-Hasakah Governorate of Syria. This cinema burned down in a fire in November 1960 and more than 200 children died inside it, it was believed to have been inspired by ethnic hatred towards Kurds.

Amouda is Burning
Amouda is Burning is a documentary book about the Amouda Cinema fire by the Kurdish-Syrian writer and lawyer Hasan Draei.

References

External links 
 50 years: Remembering the Amûde cinema fire | KURDISTAN COMMENTARY
 Rojava remembers Amûdê Cinema Disaster | ANF

Former cinemas
Cinemas in Syria
Syrian Kurdistan